Republican Accountability (RA), formerly Republican Accountability Project (RAP) and Republican Voters Against Trump (RVAT), is a political initiative launched in May 2020 by Defending Democracy Together for the 2020 U.S. presidential election cycle. The project was formed to produce a US$10 million advertising campaign focused on 100 testimonials by Republicans, conservatives, moderates, right-leaning independent voters, and former Trump voters explaining why they would not vote for Donald Trump in 2020. By August 2020, they had collected 500 testimonials.

On January 29, 2021, it transitioned to the Republican Accountability Project (RAP), which focuses on defending "Republican principles", and attacking Republicans whom they hold responsible for the 2021 storming of the United States Capitol. The organization has purchased ad campaigns to criticize members of the Republican party, particularly those allegedly involved in the January 6 incident.

Strategy

During the 2020 presidential campaign 
The advertising campaign targets white college-educated suburban voters in Pennsylvania, Wisconsin, Michigan, Florida, North Carolina and Arizona. Paul Waldman, writing for The Washington Post compared the campaign to a similar 1964 Lyndon Johnson ad called "Confessions of a Republican" giving Republicans "permission" to vote against Barry Goldwater in the 1964 presidential election.

Ad space purchased on social media and Fox News was scheduled to start the first week of June 2020. An ad produced by RVAT featuring Trump's descriptions of the coronavirus pandemic was planned to air during the Republican National Convention in Arizona, Michigan, Wisconsin, North Carolina, Florida and Pennsylvania.

After the 2020 presidential election 
After the election, the lame duck president questioned the legitimacy of the results and encouraged his supporters to demonstrate in support of overturning the results. After the 2021 storming of the US capitol, RVAP transitioned to assessing legislators on their willingness to support the assertions that the election results were not legitimate and their support of the January 6th event and of overturning the election results. In April 2021, the organization released a "GOP democracy report card" which gave 14 members of congress an A and over 100 members an F.

Ads featuring former Trump officials 
In August 2020, former senior official in the Trump administration Miles Taylor filmed a spot, calling Trump "dangerous" and saying "What we saw week in and week out, for me, after two and a half years in that administration, was terrifying. We would go in to try to talk to him about a pressing national security issue—cyberattack, terrorism threat—he wasn't interested in those things. To him, they weren't priorities." Later that month another former Homeland Security staffer from the Trump administration, Elizabeth Neumann, made an ad in which she endorsed Biden and called Trump "racist" and "a threat to America." In September, Olivia Troye, former homeland security and counterterrorism advisor to Vice President Pence and aide to the White House Coronavirus Task Force filmed an ad endorsing Biden.

Ads featuring other high-profile individuals 
In October 2020 former CIA director and retired General Michael Hayden made an ad for the group. In October former GOP congressman Jim Kolbe also made an adbrrtiment.

Leadership 
Organizers included Republican political strategist Sarah Longwell, conservative writer Bill Kristol, GOP strategist Mike Murphy, and former Jeb Bush aide Tim Miller.

Reception 
The Philadelphia Inquirer said the group was "waging guerrilla warfare within the GOP". Washington Post columnist Jennifer Rubin called the pieces "some of the best pro-Biden ads".

See also
43 Alumni for Biden
Never Trump movement
The Lincoln Project
List of former Trump administration officials who endorsed Joe Biden
List of Republicans who opposed the 2016 Donald Trump presidential campaign
List of Republicans who opposed the Donald Trump 2020 presidential campaign
List of Trump administration appointees who endorsed Joe Biden
REPAIR
Right Side PAC

References

External links
 
 

2020 United States presidential campaigns
Never Trump movement
Political campaign advertisements
Political organizations based in the United States